Lucian Goian (born 10 February 1983) is a Romanian professional footballer who last played as a centre back for Indian Super League club Chennaiyin FC.

Club career 
Born in Suceava, Romania, Goian is the younger brother of Dorin Goian who also plays as a defender. He started his career beside his brother, at Foresta Suceava. He followed in his brother's footsteps, joining Ceahlăul Piatra Neamț, but then Dorin arrived in 2005 at Steaua București, and Lucian joined their greatest rivals, Dinamo. He signed for Dinamo, after scoring against Steaua, when he played for Ceahlăul. He played for five seasons with Dinamo, with a break for a year when he returned at Ceahlăul. He also played 6 matches in the UEFA Cup for Dinamo.

In 2010, he joined Astra Ploiești, signing a contract for two years.

In January 2012, he moved to China, putting pen on paper with Tianjin Teda. He made his official debut for Tianjin on 25 February, in a 2–1 CFA Super Cup defeat against Guangzhou Evergrande. He was released by Tianjin at the end of 2012 season.

Goian signed a contract with China League One side Beijing Baxy in February 2013.

On 21 March 2017, Goian joined A-League club Perth Glory as a short-term injury replacement. He departed the Glory in May 2017.

In July 2017 he rejoined Mumbai City on a 2-year contract. He had been appointed as the captain of the side for his leadership skills and experience in the league and also one of the experienced member of the side.

In August 2019, he joined Chennaiyin FC on a 1-year deal.

Personal life
He is the younger brother of former professional footballers Gigi, Liviu and Dorin, all of them having played in the Romanian top-division Liga I. He also has three sisters. He has a son Luca.

Honours
Dinamo București
 Romanian League Championship: 2006–07
 Romanian Cup: 2004–05
 Romanian Supercup: 2005
Ceahlăul
 Romanian Second League: 2005–06
CFR Cluj
 Romanian Cup: 2015–16
Chennaiyin
 Indian Super League: runner-up 2019–20

References

External links
 
 
 
 
  

1983 births
Living people
Sportspeople from Suceava
Romanian footballers
Association football defenders
Liga I players
Liga II players
FC Dinamo București players
CSM Ceahlăul Piatra Neamț players
FC Astra Giurgiu players
FC Brașov (1936) players
CFR Cluj players
Romania under-21 international footballers
Chinese Super League players
Tianjin Jinmen Tiger F.C. players
China League One players
Beijing Sport University F.C. players
I-League players
A-League Men players
Mumbai City FC players
Perth Glory FC players
Romanian expatriate footballers
Expatriate footballers in China
Romanian expatriate sportspeople in China
Expatriate footballers in India
Romanian expatriate sportspeople in India
Expatriate soccer players in Australia
Romanian expatriate sportspeople in Australia